Sagat Abikeyeva ( (Sağat Äbıkeeva), ; born May 14, 1981 in Karaganda Region) is a Kazakhstani judoka, who played for the half-heavyweight category. She is also a three-time medalist for her division at the Asian Judo Championships (2004 in Almaty, 2005 in Tashkent, Uzbekistan, and 2007 in Kuwait City, Kuwait).

Abikeyeva represented Kazakhstan at the 2008 Summer Olympics in Beijing, where she competed for the women's half-heavyweight class (78 kg). She lost the first preliminary round match, with an ippon and a yoko shiho gatame (side four quarter hold), to Cuba's Yalennis Castillo. Because her opponent advanced further into the final, Abikeyeva offered another shot for the bronze medal by defeating India's Divya Tewar, with an ippon and an outside contest area technique (P16), in the first repechage bout. Unfortunately, she finished only in ninth place, after losing out the second repechage bout to France's Stéphanie Possamaï, who successfully scored an ippon and a juji gatame (back lying perpendicular armbar), at four minutes and twenty-two seconds.

References

External links

NBC Olympics Profile

Kazakhstani female judoka
Living people
Olympic judoka of Kazakhstan
Judoka at the 2008 Summer Olympics
People from Karaganda Region
1981 births
Judoka at the 2002 Asian Games
Asian Games competitors for Kazakhstan
21st-century Kazakhstani women